The Gladstone Chair of Greek is an academic position that was one of the original endowments of the foundation of the University of Liverpool in 1881. The Chair was named in recognition of the scholarship of W. E. Gladstone, the British prime minister, and the close association of the Gladstone family with Liverpool.

The chair fell vacant after Professor Long left in 1983 to take up a position in the United States, but was revived in 2017.

Gladstone Professors of Greek
 1891–1898 Gerald Henry Rendall 
 1898–1906 Gilbert Austin Davies
 1907–1910 Sir John Lynton Myres
 1911–1914 Carl Friedrich Ferdinand Lehmann-Haupt
 1919–1921 Alfred Chilton Pearson (subsequently Regius Professor of Greek at Cambridge University) 
 1922–1950 Archibald Young Campbell
 1950–1972 Arthur Hilary Armstrong
 1973–1983 Anthony Arthur Long
2017 -  Christopher John Tuplin

References

University of Liverpool
Greek, Gladstone, Liverpool
Greek, Gladstone, Liverpool
1891 establishments in England
Greek-language education